{{DISPLAYTITLE:Xi1 Lupi}}

Xi1 Lupi (ξ1 Lup, ξ1 Lupi) is a probable binary star in the southern constellation of Lupus. It is faintly visible to the naked eye with an apparent visual magnitude of 5.1, and forms a visual double star with Xi2 Lupi. Based upon an annual parallax shift of 23.60 mas as seen from Earth, it is located around 140 light-years from the Sun. It is a member of the Upper Scorpius sub-group of the nearby Sco OB2 association.

This star shows periodic radial velocity variations that can be best explained as a spectroscopic binary system. The star is an estimated 237 million years old and is spinning with a projected rotational velocity of 78 km/s.

References

A-type main-sequence stars
Spectroscopic binaries
Lupus (constellation)
Lupi, Xi1
142629
078105
5925
Durchmusterung objects
Upper Scorpius